Nemanja Čorović (Serbian Cyrillic: Немања Чоровић; born 26 October 1975) is a retired Serbian footballer.

Career
Čorović started his career in Montenegrin clubs FK Mogren and FK Budućnost Podgorica, before moving to Belgrade to play with FK Čukarički. He later transferred to Slovenian NK Maribor, subsequently played for Croatian NK Pomorac, before moving to Cyprus, where he played for AEL FC and became the fan's favorite player. On summer of 2007 he was given on loan to APOEL where he won the Cypriot Cup. He finished his career in Digenis Morphou in the Cypriot Second Division after the 2009–10 season.

External links
 Profile at Playerhistory
 Profile at AEL official website
 Stats from Slovenia at Prvaliga

1975 births
Living people
Sportspeople from Zadar
Serbs of Croatia
Slovenian PrvaLiga players
Serbian footballers
Serbian expatriate footballers
FK Mogren players
FK Budućnost Podgorica players
FK Čukarički players
NK Maribor players
Expatriate footballers in Slovenia
Serbian expatriate sportspeople in Slovenia
AEL Limassol players
APOEL FC players
Digenis Akritas Morphou FC players
Cypriot First Division players
Cypriot Second Division players
Expatriate footballers in Cyprus
Association football forwards
NK Pomorac 1921 players